= Chabashim =

Chabashim may refer to:

- Yemenite Jews
- Beta Israel or Ethiopian Jews
